The Estadio Carlos Iturralde is a multi-use stadium in the Mexican city of Mérida, Yucatán.  It is currently used mostly for football matches and is the home stadium of Venados. The stadium holds 15,087 people.

History 
The stadium received the name Carlos Iturralde Rivero in honor of the only Yucatecan football player to have played in the Mexico national football team. The first goal scored in the history of the stadium was from the Yucatecan Alonso Diego Molina, a former player of the school Modelo.

There were plans to construct a new stadium in Ucú, a suburb of Mérida. The new stadium, was scheduled to begin construction in January 2009 and planned for completion in 2011, and would have had a capacity of 28,500 people.

References 

Carlos Iturralde
Mérida, Yucatán
Sports venues in Yucatán
Sports venues completed in 1987
1987 establishments in Mexico